Grzegorz Miętus (born February 20, 1993, in Zakopane) is a Polish ski jumper.

Personal life
Grzegorz Miętus was born in Zakopane, Poland, but lives in Dzianisz. His elder brother, Krzysztof Miętus, has competed in ski jumping at the Winter Olympics.

Career
On February 2, 2008, he debuted in the Continental Cup in Zakopane on large hill, where was 43rd. He competed at the World Junior Championships 2009 in Štrbské Pleso, where the individual was 20th and won  a bronze medal in the normal hill with Polish team - Maciej Kot, Jakub Kot and Andrzej Zapotoczny. On December 20, 2009, won a first in his career Continental Cup competition in Otepää. He debuted in World Cup on January 22, 2010, in Zakopane, where took 48th an 47th place. On February 3, 2010, won first points in World Cup competition in Klingenthal, where has 22nd position.

References

External links

1993 births
Living people
Polish male ski jumpers
Sportspeople from Zakopane
Competitors at the 2015 Winter Universiade
21st-century Polish people